Phil Shao (December 28, 1973 - August 23, 1998) was a goofy-footed professional skateboarder and journalist from Redwood City, California. Before his death, Shao was to be the next editor-in-chief of Thrasher magazine.

Skateboarding career 
Shao was featured in many skate magazines including Thrasher Magazine, Big Brother Skateboard Magazine, Skateboarder Magazine, TransWorld Skateboarding. Shao graced the July 1996 cover of Thrasher magazine with a smith grind on the top rail at Fort Miley. Shao was known as a master of many different styles of skating including street and vert. Jake Phelps refers to Shao as "Hosoi and the Gonz in one dude."

Shao appeared in many skateboarding videos in his career, traveling the world to skateboard. His last video was "Dedications" from Think Skateboards, released shortly before his death.

Skate video parts 

 1994 - Just Another Day On The Range - Think 
 1994 - Issue 8 - 411VM
 1995 - High 5 - Etnies 
 1996 - Jim's Ramp Jam - Deluxe 
 1996 - Hitting The Streets - Thrasher
 1996 - Damage - Think
 1997 - Yellow - Emerica
 1998 - Portable Flat Bar 
 1998 - Dedication - Think

Journalism

Thrasher Magazine 
In addition to skating, Shao worked at Thrasher magazine as a copy editor. Shortly before his untimely death, Phil was informed he was to be named Editor of Thrasher Magazine. After Shao's passing, Jake Phelps stayed on as Editor-in-chief.

Death 
On August 22, 1998, Phil Shao died in a car accident in Arcata, California.

Phil Shao Memorial Skate Park 
In the summer of 2003, Redwood City collaborated with Phil's friends and family to build a skatepark dedicated to Phil called the Phil Shao Memorial Skate Park. The park is a 13,000 square foot skatepark with 5 bowls, rails, and ledges.

Personal life 
Shao had an English degree from the University of California at Berkeley.

References

External links 
Remembering Phil Shao - Thrasher
Phil Shao's "Tribute" Video - 2020

1973 births
1998 deaths
American skateboarders
Sportspeople from the San Francisco Bay Area
Road incident deaths in California